Antonio Napoletano (8 June 1937 – 25 March 2019) was an Italian Roman Catholic bishop.

Napoletano was born in Italy and was ordained to the priesthood in 1961. He served as bishop of the Roman Catholic Diocese of Sessa Aurunca, Italy, from 1994 to 2013.

Notes

1937 births
2019 deaths
20th-century Italian Roman Catholic bishops
21st-century Italian Roman Catholic bishops